Isabela's 4th congressional district is one of the six congressional districts of the Philippines in the province of Isabela. It has been represented in the House of Representatives of the Philippines since 1987. The district consists of the independent component city of Santiago and the municipalities of Cordon, Dinapigue, Jones, and San Agustin. It is currently represented in the 19th Congress by Joseph S. Tan of the Partido Federal ng Pilipinas (PFP).

Representation history

Election results

2022

|-bgcolor=black
|colspan=5|

2019

2016

2013

2010

See also 

 Legislative districts of Isabela

References 

Congressional districts of the Philippines
Politics of Isabela (province)
1987 establishments in the Philippines
Congressional districts of Cagayan Valley
Constituencies established in 1987